John or Jack Bowen may refer to:

Politicians
William Bowen (British politician) (John William Bowen, 1876–1965), Member of Parliament for Crewe, 1929–1931
John C. Bowen (1872–1957), Canadian clergyman, politician, and sixth and longest-serving lieutenant governor of Alberta
John Henry Bowen (1780–1822), American politician
John W. Bowen (1926–2011), Republican politician in the Ohio Senate

Religious figures
John Bowen (bishop) (1815–1859), bishop of Sierra Leone
John W. E. Bowen Sr. (1855–1933), Methodist clergyman and educator

Writers
John Eliot Bowen (1858–1890), American author
John Bowen (British author) (1924–2019), British playwright and novelist

Others
John Bowen (Royal Navy officer) (1780–1827), English sailor and administrator; founded the first settlement at Hobart, Australia
John Bowen (pirate) (died 1704), pirate active in the Indian Ocean and Red Sea
John Bowen (antiquary) (1756–1832), English painter, genealogist and antiquarian
John Bowen (alderman) (1844–1926), English businessman
John Clyde Bowen (1888–1978), U.S. federal judge 
John J. Bowen Jr. (born 1955), American entrepreneur
John S. Bowen (1830–1863), American Confederate general
John S. Bowen (executive) (born c. 1927), American advertising executive
John S. Bowen (sound designer), American synthesizer designer
John Templeton Bowen (1857–1940), American dermatologist
John T. Bone (John Gilbert Bowen, born 1947), British-born American porn director
John Bowen, 3rd Baronet (1918–1939), of the Bowen baronets

Sport
Jack Bowen (rugby union)

See also
Jonathan Bowen (born 1956), British computer scientist and professor
Bowen (surname)